is a railway station located in Asuka, Takaichi, Nara, Japan, on the Kintetsu Railway Yoshino Line.

Lines 
 Kintetsu Railway
 Yoshino Line

Platforms and tracks

Surroundings

Takamatsuzuka Tomb
Ishibutai Kofun
Oni no Manaita, Oni no Setchin
Tomb of Emperor Tenmu and Empress Jitō
Tomb of Emperor Kinmei

References

External links
 

Railway stations in Japan opened in 1929
Stations of Kintetsu Railway
Railway stations in Nara Prefecture